The All Ethiopian Unity Party was a political party in Ethiopia founded in 2002. Members split off of the All-Amhara People's Organization over whether or not the party should remain ethnically-oriented. At the legislative elections on 15 May 2005, the party was part of the Coalition for Unity and Democracy that won 109 out of 527 seats.

References

External links
Official Homepage
All Ethiopian Unity Party New York Times Article

2019 disestablishments in Ethiopia
Defunct political parties in Ethiopia
Political parties disestablished in 2019
Political parties with year of establishment missing